Paju Yeom clan is one of the Korean clans. Their Bon-gwan is in Paju, Gyeonggi Province. According to the research held in 2015, the number of Paju Yeom clan was 63350. He was Chinese, and he settled in Paju, Silla to avoid confliction in Later Tang. He supported Taejo of Goryeo, contributed to unifying three Korean dynasties and appointed as High Merit Minister.

See also 
 Korean clan names of foreign origin

References

External links 
 

 
Korean clan names of Chinese origin
Yeom clans